WWE vs ECW: Head-to-Head was an event produced by World Wrestling Entertainment (WWE). It was held on June 7, 2006 at the Nutter Center in Dayton, Ohio, four days before the ECW One Night Stand pay-per-view.

The event was marked by matches between WWE and ECW wrestlers.

Storylines
WWE vs. ECW Head-to-Head featured professional wrestling matches that involved wrestlers from pre-existing scripted feuds, plots, and storylines that played out on WWE's weekly television programs, Raw and SmackDown. Wrestlers portrayed heroes or villains as they followed a series of events that built tension and culminated in a wrestling match or series of matches.

Results

Eliminations in WWE vs. ECW battle royal 
 – WWE
 – ECW
 – Winner

1Raw (with its wrestlers Big Show and Randy Orton) had at first won the Battle Royal, But then Big Show took off his RAW Shirt, revealing that he had sided with ECW, and then proceeded to eliminate Randy Orton to win the match as a part of ECW.

See also
2006 in professional wrestling

References

WWE shows
Extreme Championship Wrestling shows
ECW (WWE brand)
June 2006 events in the United States
2006 in professional wrestling
2006 in Ohio
Events in Ohio
Professional wrestling in Dayton, Ohio